The following is a list of public holidays in Oman.

Omani culture
Oman
Oman
Events in Oman